Major-General Nicholas David Ashmore CB OBE (born September 1961) is a British Army officer who served as Military Secretary and General Officer Scotland.

Military career
Ashmore was commissioned into the Royal Artillery on 3 January 1984. After seeing active service during the Iraq War, he became Colonel Army Plans in December 2004, Commander Royal Artillery for 3rd (UK) Division in July 2007 and Director Plans at Army Headquarters in July 2009 before becoming Director Strategic Asset-Management and Programme Team at the Defence Infrastructure Organisation in September 2011. He went on to be Military Secretary in March 2015 and, additionally, General Officer, Scotland, in July 2015.

He was appointed Officer of the Order of the British Empire (OBE) on 31 October 2003 for his service during the Iraq War and Companion of the Order of the Bath (CB) in the 2016 Birthday Honours.

References

 

|-

British Army major generals
Officers of the Order of the British Empire
Royal Artillery officers
Companions of the Order of the Bath
1961 births
Living people
British Army personnel of the Iraq War